Adelino is a given name. Notable people with the name include:

Adelino Fontoura (1859-1884), Brazilian poet and actor
Adelino da Palma Carlos (1905-1992), Portuguese politician
Adelino Sitoy (1936-2021), Filipino politician
Adelino Amaro da Costa (1943–1980), Portuguese politician
Adelino da Palma Carlos (1905–1992), Portuguese lawyer, scholar, politician and a freemason
Adelino Mano Quetá (1944-2014), Bissau-Guinean politician
Adelino Maltez (born 1951), Portuguese lawyer and professor
Adelino Teixeira (footballer) (born 1952), Portuguese football left-back
Adelino Castelo David (born 1955), Santomean banker and politician
Adelino Nunes (born 1960), Portuguese football defensive midfielder
Adelino Hidalgo (born 1963), Spanish middle distance runner
Adelino Batista da Silva Neto (born 1973), Brazilian footballer
Adelino Pestana (born 1992), Angolan handball player
Adelino (footballer, born 1994), Brazilian football forward
Adelino Trindade (born 1995), East Timorese football defender
Adelino Lucas, Santomean politician

See also 

Adelino (disambiguation)
Estádio Adelino Ribeiro Novo, Portuguese football stadium for Gil Vicente
Campo do Adelino Rodrigues, Portuguese football stadium for C.F. União
Billy Gonsalves (1908-1977), born Adelino William Gonsalves, American soccer inside-left
Neno (footballer) (1962-2021), born Adelino Augusto da Graça Barbosa Barros, Portuguese football goalkeeper
Jordão (footballer, born 1971), born Adelino José Martins Batista, Portuguese football midfielder
Lino (footballer, born 1976), born Adelino Augusto Lopes, Bissau-Guinean football right-back
Vieirinha (born 1986), born Adelino André Vieira de Freitas, Portuguese football winger

Masculine given names